Thomas Sinnickson (December 21, 1744 – May 15, 1817) was an American merchant and statesman from Salem, New Jersey. He represented  in the U.S. House in 1789–1791 and again in 1797–1799.

He was the granduncle of Clement Hall Sinnickson and uncle of Thomas Sinnickson.  He was born near Salem, in Salem County, New Jersey, on December 21, 1744; completed preparatory studies; engaged in mercantile pursuits; served as captain in the Continental Army; held several local offices; member of the New Jersey General Assembly in 1777, 1782, 1784, 1785, 1787, and 1788; elected to the First Congress (March 4, 1789 – March 3, 1791); elected as a Federalist to the Fifth Congress (March 4, 1797 – March 3, 1799); died in Salem, N.J., May 15, 1817; interment in St. John's Episcopal Cemetery, in Salem.

References

External links

Biography of Thomas Sinnickson from The Political Graveyard
Representative Thomas Sinnickson from First Federal Congress Project

1744 births
1817 deaths
Members of the New Jersey General Assembly
Burials at St. John's Episcopal Cemetery, Salem, New Jersey
People of colonial New Jersey
Politicians from Salem County, New Jersey
Federalist Party members of the United States House of Representatives from New Jersey